Alfredo il grande is an 1819 opera, melodramma seria in 2 acts, by Johann Simon Mayr to a libretto by Bartolomeo Merelli after Eraldo ed Emma by Gaetano Rossi. It premiered 26 December 1819 at Bergamo, Teatro della Società.

Recordings
 Alfredo il grande  Franz Hauk Naxos

References

Operas
1819 operas
Operas by Simon Mayr
Italian-language operas